Francisc Horvat (Hungarian: Ferenc Horváth; born 19 October 1928) is a retired Greco-Roman wrestler from Romania. He competed at the 1952 and 1956 Summer Olympics and won a bronze medal in 1956.

References

1928 births
Living people
Olympic wrestlers of Romania
Wrestlers at the 1952 Summer Olympics
Wrestlers at the 1956 Summer Olympics
Romanian male sport wrestlers
Olympic bronze medalists for Romania
Olympic medalists in wrestling
Medalists at the 1956 Summer Olympics
20th-century Romanian people